Leonard Gordon Goodman (born 25 April 1944) is an English professional ballroom dancer, dance judge, and coach.

He has appeared as head judge on the television dance programmes Strictly Come Dancing, a programme where various celebrities compete for the glitter ball trophy, from its beginning in 2004 until 2016 and Dancing with the Stars from 2005 until 2022. He also runs a ballroom dance school in Dartford, Kent.

Early life
Goodman was born in London. He moved to Blackfen when he was six years old and later attended Westwood Secondary Modern School, where he was a member of the cricket team.

Goodman was one of three children and the only child of the family to stay in the family business, as his other siblings all moved to Newcastle.

Career
Goodman was as an apprentice welder for Harland and Wolff in Woolwich. He started dancing at the late age of 19, after his doctor recommended it as therapy for a foot injury. 

Goodman turned professional, won various competitions, and retired from dancing after winning the British Championships at Blackpool in his late twenties. Goodman is a recipient of the Carl Alan Award, in recognition of outstanding contributions to dance and, in 2006 and 2007, a show in which he appeared was nominated for the Emmy Award in the Outstanding Reality/Competition Program category.

Strictly Come Dancing

Goodman appeared as head judge on the BBC One dance competition Strictly Come Dancing from its inception in 2004 until 2016. He appeared on the panel with Arlene Phillips, Bruno Tonioli, and Craig Revel Horwood; Phillips was later replaced by Alesha Dixon and then Darcey Bussell. In July 2016, Goodman announced he would be leaving the show at the end of that year's series. His final appearance was on the Christmas Day Special. On 9 May 2017, it was announced that Shirley Ballas would succeed Goodman as head judge.

Dancing with the Stars

Goodman has been the sole head judge on Strictly Come Dancing's American adaptation, Dancing with the Stars. He has appeared with fellow judges Carrie Ann Inaba and Bruno Tonioli since the show's inception, and for five seasons with alternating fourth judges Julianne Hough and Derek Hough. He did not appear as a judge in season 21 and season 29, but presented short segments on dance styles during the latter season. On November 14, 2022, Goodman announced during the season 31 semifinals broadcast that he would be retiring from the show to spend more time with his family in Great Britain.

Other television work
From 30 March to 9 April 2012, Goodman hosted a three-part BBC One documentary that was broadcast in the United States by PBS for the 100th anniversary of the voyage and sinking of the RMS Titanic. It capitalised on his experience as a welder at Harland and Wolff. Goodman interviewed descendants of survivors and introduced viewers to memorials and significant sites in the United Kingdom.

In 2005 he voiced Professor in the five-time Emmy award-winning children's program, Auto-B-Good.

In 2013 Goodman presented the BBC Four programme Len Goodman's Dance Band Days. He also hosted Len Goodman's Perfect Christmas on Boxing Day on BBC One.

In August 2014 Goodman was one of a number of well known faces taking part in ITV's two-part documentary series Secrets from the Clink.

In November and December 2013 Goodman and Lucy Worsley presented the BBC Four three-part show Dancing Cheek to Cheek.

In October 2014 Goodman hosted BBC One show Holiday of My Lifetime. The show returned for a second series in February 2016, where he was featured with Dan Walker, Carol Kirkwood, and many more 
In November 2015, Len and chef Ainsley Harriott presented the BBC show Len and Ainsley's Big Food Adventure, a 10-part series exploring world cuisine in England and Wales.

In 2017 Goodman presented a family game show called Partners in Rhyme, based on Matt Edmondson's game, Obama Llama.

In October 2021 Goodman made a surprise appearance in Hollyoaks as part of the serial drama’s ongoing dance storyline, when his voice was heard when dance teacher Trish Minniver, played by Denise Welch, was reminiscing.

Radio
Between 2013 and 2018 Goodman occasionally presented a Sunday afternoon music show on BBC Radio 2 during some of Paul O'Grady's weeks off. Goodman played music that he grew up with, mostly of an easy nature together with spoken memories of his young life and family.

In 2021, he hosted 3 special bank holiday shows for Boom Radio.

Other work
In 2006 he appeared on an all singing/dancing version of The Weakest Link and beat Stacey Haynes in the final to win the prize money of £8050 for charity.

Personal life
Goodman married his dancing partner, Cherry Kingston, but they were later divorced. He then had a long-term relationship with a woman named Lesley and they had a son, John. Goodman was 36 at this time. Lesley, he wrote, was the ex-wife of "a bloke called Wilf Pine who had managed the band Black Sabbath. Lesley and Wilf got married in Connecticut...."

Goodman and Lesley's son, John William Goodman Bell, was born on 26 January 1981 but at the age of 12 moved with his mother back to her native Isle of Wight after his parents had broken up. As of 2012, John started Latin and ballroom dancing at his father's Goodman Dance Centre.

On 30 December 2012 Goodman married his companion of more than ten years, Sue Barrett, a 47-year-old dance teacher, in a small ceremony at a London dining club Mosimann's.

Goodman is a West Ham United fan and was featured on the BBC football show Football Focus on 26 September 2009. He is also a keen cricket fan, and, in 2009, took part in a celebrity Ashes cricket game.

Goodman was diagnosed with prostate cancer in March 2009, which was treated surgically at a London hospital.

In October 2011, Goodman appeared on the BBC's Who Do You Think You Are?, in which he discovered that one of his maternal ancestors was a silk-weaver who died a pauper in the Bethnal Green workhouse. Goodman's great great grandfather, Josef/Joseph Sosnowski, came from Poland, where he fought in the anti-tsarist November uprising for which he was awarded Virtuti Militari, Poland's highest military decoration for heroism and courage. After finding out about his ancestry, Goodman said: "I feel no different, I look no different, I am no different and yet I’m not what I thought I was. I thought that I was truly an Anglo-Saxon, English through and through."

In September 2021 it was reported that Goodman had undergone surgery, in 2020, for a small facial melanoma.

Filmography
Strictly Come Dancing (2004–2016)
Dancing with the Stars (2005–2022)
Titanic with Len Goodman (2012)
Len Goodman's Dance Band Days (2013)
Len Goodman's Perfect Christmas (2013)
Dancing Cheek to Cheek (2013)
Secrets from the Clink (2014)
Holiday of My Lifetime (2014–2016)
The Kylie Show (2007)
Perspectives: For The Love of Fred Astaire (2015)
Len and Ainsley's Big Food Adventure (2015)
Strictly Len Goodman (2016)
Len Goodman's Partners in Rhyme (2017)
Hollyoaks (2021)

Publications
Smith, Rupert (2005), Strictly Come Dancing; dance consultant: Len Goodman. London: BBC Books

References

External links

Len Goodman Official website
James Goodman Dance Website
Goodman bio at BBC site
Interview with Len Goodman in Dartford Living magazine

Goodman celebrates 25 years hosting competitions at Pontin's

1944 births
British ballroom dancers
British male dancers
British television personalities
Living people
People from Bethnal Green
People from Dartford
Judges in American reality television series